The National Liberation Committee of Ivory Coast (CNLCI) was an Ivorian opposition group, with its political origins in the Party of the African Rally (PRA). CNLCI was founded in Conakry on May 18, 1959 by a group of Ivorian exiles. CNLCI promoted the formation of a 'United States of Africa'.

Sources
Gbagbo, Laurent: Côte d'Ivoire, Pour une alternative démocratique. Paris: L'Harmattan, 1983.
Defunct political parties in Ivory Coast
Pan-Africanism in Ivory Coast
Pan-Africanist political parties in Africa
Political parties in French West Africa